Alyeska Resort is a ski resort in the Girdwood  area of Anchorage, Alaska, approximately  from downtown Anchorage. Mount Alyeska is part of the Chugach mountain range and the Alyeska Resort is the largest ski area in the state. It includes the mountaintop Mt. Alyeska Roundhouse, which is listed on the National Register of Historic Places.

Facilities and terrain

The Alyeska Ski Corporation was founded in 1954, and the first chairlift and day lodge were opened in 1959. The Roundhouse ski lodge and ski patrol station at the top of the mountain began construction in 1960. It is an octagonal building. Still standing, it was listed on the National Register of Historic Places as "Mt. Alyeska Roundhouse" in 2003, and now houses a museum to local ski history.

Currently, Alyeska has five chairlifts, one high-speed tram, and two Magic Carpets. Of the five chairlifts, one is co-owned by Alyeska and the Tanaka Foundation (Chair 5). Chairs 6 and 4 are high-speed detachable quads, while Chairs 7 and 3 are normal quads. Chair 4 was updated to a high speed quad in 2012. A sixth chairlift, Chair 1, was removed from service in the summer of 2017.

Chair 4 ends halfway up the mountain. The tram ends three-quarters of the way up the mountain. The interconnected buildings contain the Roundhouse (patrol quarters), and a much newer facility housing the upper tram terminal, a quick-service cafeteria, and the Seven Glaciers 4-star restaurant and bar. At the base of the tram is the modern 300-room Hotel Alyeska.

Several areas above Chair 6 are occasionally opened, but require hiking to access. Plans to build a new chair lift higher up the mountain have been announced.

Mount Alyeska is a fairly challenging mountain, and has a much higher percentage of advanced and expert runs, as compared to most other mountains in North America. It has a small section for the novice, but the rest of the mountain is almost entirely for the intermediate and the advanced skiers.

Terrain Aspects
 North: 35%
 West: 40%
 East: 0%
 South: 25%

Racing
Alyeska hosted World Cup giant slalom ski races in 1973 for both men and women. Alyeska first hosted the U.S. Alpine Championships in 1963; the championships returned in 1981, 2004, 2007, and 2009.

American Olympic gold medalist Tommy Moe (b. 1970) sharpened his racing skills at Alyeska as a teenager in the 1980s.

New owner
Alyeska was bought in December 2006 by John Byrne III, who says he plans to make many improvements to the resort, concentrating on people who come to ski for the day. Some of the improvements were installing RFID gates at all of the lifts, taking the bubbles off chair 6, because they were vandalized, repainting the tram, and building the only superpipe in Alaska. According to a statement issued October 9, 2018 by the resort's director of marketing, Eric Fullerton, Alyeska Resort has entered into a contract to sell "substantially all of its resort assets" to Pomeroy Lodging.

Climate
Alyeska has a subarctic climate (Köppen: Dfc), with short but mild summers and long, snowy winters. Snowfall is extremely heavy, owing to the Aleutian Low, with an average year getting  of snow at the base (elevation 250 feet above sea level) and an average exceeding  at the top of the Glacier Bowl Express (GBX) chairlift.   The record annual snowfall measured at the top of the GBX is  during the 2000–01 season. Precipitation in general is heavy, but is considerably less from late spring to mid- summer. A freeze has been recorded for every month of the year.

See also
Alaska
National Register of Historic Places listings in Anchorage, Alaska

References

External links
 
 Powder Tour Social Community - Member submitted Alyeska images

1954 establishments in Alaska
Aerial tramways in the United States
Alaska Anchorage Seawolves
Tourism in Anchorage, Alaska
Hotels in Alaska
Ski areas and resorts in Alaska
Sports venues in Anchorage, Alaska
Event venues on the National Register of Historic Places in Alaska
Sports venues on the National Register of Historic Places